Erin M. Riley (born 1985) is a Brooklyn-based artist whose work focuses on women and women's issues primarily in hand-woven hand dyed wool tapestries. Riley's work challenges society's comfortability with art through her tapestries by displaying shocking images including nudity, drugs, violence, self harm, sexuality, and menstruation.

Life
Riley's childhood as a middle child and an introvert often left her to her devices, leading her to entertain herself through hobbies like art and reading. One of her biggest inspirations is Louise Bourgeois works and personal story, as well as Riley's own childhood and personal experiences.

She graduated with a BFA in fibers in 2007 from Massachusetts College of Art and Design, and with a MFA in fibers in 2009 from Tyler School of Art.

Career
Riley first learned how to sew in a Home Economics class in high school. Her quickly honed skills and instant attraction to the craft prompted her to receive her first sewing machine on her next birthday, which she still owns.  All of Riley's work Is created on a floor loom with wool hand dyed by Riley. She utilizes social media platforms like Facebook, Instagram, and Tumblr, gathering pictures she compiles into different folders coupled with research to create art for her exhibitions. She uses these images  as a reference to create her tapestries directly from the computer rather than sketching the design on paper before hand; however, she does takes notes for each piece in a journal and her  phone's notes.
Her 2010 "Nudes" series appropriates images posted to social media, which Riley has recreated in her medium. 

Her work was shown during the 2015 Art Basel Miami week at Miami Projects and the KITH Homage exhibit concurrently. In 2013, Erin M. Riley was among eight women artists featured in Seattle-based Brian Ohno Gallery's exhibition entitled "Get Naked," which focused on works relating to the female body and sexuality. 
Also in 2013, her work was shown at Philadelphia's Paradigm Gallery and the Joseph Gross Gallery at the University of Arizona.

Exhibitions 
Solo Exhibitions 
 A Reminder of Being There, Jonathan Hopson Gallery, Houston, TX, 2020
 Used Tape, P.P.O.W Gallery, New York, NY, 2018
 Head On, Never Apart, Montreal, QC, Canada, 2017
 Simple, Hashimoto Contemporary, San Francisco, CA, 2017 
 18/bi/f/ma, Brilliant Champions, Brooklyn, NY, 2016
 Anew, Hashimoto Contemporary, San Francisco, CA, 2016
 Darkness Lies Ahead, Joshua Liner Gallery, New York, NY, 2015
 The Pain Comes in Waves, OGAARD Gallery, Oakland, CA, 2014
 Crimson Landslide, Space 1026, Philadelphia, PA , 2014
 Undo, University of Wisconsin Gallery, Oshkosh, WI, 2013
 Show Me More, Guerrero Gallery, San Francisco, CA , 2013
 Crush, Extension Gallery, Boston, MA , 2012
 Forgotten in a File, Guerrero Gallery, San Francisco, CA, 2012 
 Erin M Riley, Fleisher Art Memorial, Philadelphia, PA, 2011
 Graphic, Central Utah Arts Center, Ephraim, UT, 2011
 Erin M Riley: New Works, Guerrero Gallery, San Francisco, CA, 2010 
 Daddy Issues, Helene Davis Gallery, Artspace, Richmond, VA, 2010

Awards 
 NYSCA/NYFA Artist Fellowship, Crafts/Sculpture, 2020
 Ruth and Harold Chenven Foundation Grant, New York, NY, 2012
 Vermont Studio Center Artist-in-Residence Full Fellowship, Johnson, VT, 2011
 Artist-in-Residence at the McColl Center for Art + Innovation in Charlotte, NC, 2011
 Kittredge Foundation Grant Recipient, Cambridge, MA, 2011
 Best in Show, Radius 250, Artspace, Richmond, VA, 2009 
 Project Completion Grant, Tyler School of Art, Philadelphia, PA, 2009 
 Graduate Academic Tuition Assistantship, Tyler School of Art, Elkins Park, PA, 2008 
 Graduate Academic Tuition Assistantship, Tyler School of Art, Elkins Park, PA, 2007 
 Marilyn Pappas Award, Massachusetts College of Art and Design, Boston, MA, 2007 
 Barbara L. Kuhlman Foundation, Inc. Fiber Scholarship, Willet, NY, 2006
 Barbara L. Kuhlman Foundation, Inc. Fiber Scholarship, Willet, NY, 2005

References

External links
official website

1985 births
Living people
21st-century American women artists
Artists from Brooklyn
Massachusetts College of Art and Design alumni
Temple University alumni
Tapestry artists